KDVS (90.3 FM) is an American student and community radio station based in Davis, California. Featuring a freeform programming format, the station is owned by Regents of the University of California. Broadcasting at 13,000 watts, it is one of the most powerful freeform university-based radio stations in the United States. With a good enough car radio the station can be heard as far east as Lake Tahoe.

A free newsletter entitled KDViationS, written and composed by the volunteer staff of the radio station, is published quarterly. The station also produces This Week in Science, which is broadcast live on the station but is known mostly in podcast form. KDVS is also the home of the public affairs programs Radio Parallax and Dr. Andy's Poetry and Technology Hour.

History
The  idea for starting KDVS was conceived by students in the former Beckett-Hughes dormitories in late 1963. Using the call letters KCD and 880 AM as the frequency, the students "broadcast" their first program on February 1, 1964, from a laundry room in Beckett Hall. The station's signal, which was transmitted by telephone lines, could only reach certain dorms.

Two years later, in 1966, KCD and the university's student government, Associated Students of UC Davis, joined in applying for a Class D noncommercial broadcast license. The FCC awarded the license to the university on October 18, 1967. By then, the station had moved to the newly constructed Memorial Union, where its inaugural broadcast was aired on January 2, 1968, under the call letters KDVS.

Initially, KDVS had 10 watts and broadcast on 91.5 FM in mono. In 1971, the station's signal was upgraded to stereo, but a far more significant development occurred six years later. In 1977, during a period when the FCC was forcing Class D stations to either upgrade or go silent, KDVS received a power increase to 5,000 watts and moved to its current frequency 90.3 FM. Two additional power increases were approved by the FCC over the years: 9,200 watts in 1983 and 13,000 watts in 2013. The latter increase enabled the station to cover most of Sacramento, as well as portions of Placer, El Dorado, and Solano counties.

In summer 2006, KDVS started the non-profit record label KDVS Recordings to promote independent artists in the Davis and Sacramento areas.

Several now-famous artists were members of the KDVS staff in their early years. Former KDVS DJs include DJ Shadow, Lyrics Born, Gift of Gab and Chief Xcel of Blackalicious, Steve Wynn of The Dream Syndicate, and Kendra Smith of both The Dream Syndicate and Opal.

See also
 List of community radio stations in the United States

References

External links
 Official web site
 KDVS on DavisWiki.org

Freeform radio stations
University of California, Davis
DVS
Community radio stations in the United States
DVS
Radio stations established in 1964